Terebra lindae is a species of sea snail, a marine gastropod mollusc in the family Terebridae, the auger snails.

Description
Original description: "Shell very elongated, slender: suture bordered by row of very large, rounded beads; row of smaller beads below (anterior to) row of large beads; rest of whorl smooth, shiny; color orange-tan with two rows of larger, reddish-brown spots on each whorl, one row along suture, often between subsutural beads; 
columella and siphonal canal bright yellow; interior of aperture orange-tan."

Distribution
Locus typicus: "(Dredged from) 150 metres depth
50 kilometres South of Apalachicola, Florida, USA."

References

Terebridae
Gastropods described in 1987